Charles Lushington (14 April 1785 – 23 September 1866) was a British Whig politician, and servant for the East India Company, and secretary to the Bengal Presidency.

Lushington was the younger brother of Stephen Lushington, a British judge and Whig Member of Parliament (MP) for various constituencies between 1806 and 1841. In 1805, he married Sarah, daughter of General Joseph Gascoyne. After her death in 1839, he married Julia Jane née Lane, widow of Thomas Teed, in 1844.

Lushington first became a Whig MP for Ashburton at the 1835 general election, and held the seat until the 1841 general election, when he did not seek re-election. He returned, however, six years later, for Westminster at the 1847 general election and held the seat until the next general election in 1852, when he did not seek re-election. During his time in Parliament, Lushington was a reformer, favouring the use of a secret ballot, triennial parliaments, and extension of the suffrage. He also opposed religious privileges, publishing three works on religious questions.

Lushington died in Brighton, Sussex in 1866.

References

External links
 

UK MPs 1847–1852
Whig (British political party) MPs for English constituencies
1785 births
1866 deaths
Members of the Parliament of the United Kingdom for Ashburton
Younger sons of baronets